Son of the Wind is an album by the American folk singer Arlo Guthrie, released in 1992. It is an album of cowboy songs recorded with Guthrie's band, Shenandoah. Guthrie had wanted to make such an album since he was a child.

Critical reception

The Seattle Times called the album "a refreshing, spunky set, occasionally marred by Guthrie's casual vocal stylings but more often rescued by a terrific little band."

Track listing
"Buffalo Gals" (Traditional) 2:40
"Dead or Alive" (Woody Guthrie) 3:03
"Streets of Laredo" (Traditional) 3:48
"Ridin' Down the Canyon" (Gene Autry, Smiley Burnette) 4:24
"South Coast" (Sam Eskin, Lillian Bos Ross, Richard Dehr, Frank Miller) 4:17
"Shenandoah" (Traditional) 5:10
"Gal I Left Behind" 1:57
"When the Cactus Is in Bloom" (Jimmie Rodgers) 3:08
"Woody's Rag/Hard Work" (Woody Guthrie) 3:52
"I Ride an Old Paint" 3:47
"Utah Carroll" 7:02
"Red River Valley" 5:01

Personnel
Arlo Guthrie – guitar, vocals
 Edward Gerhard – guitar
John Culpo – accordion
Dan Velika – bass
Terry "A la Berry" Hall – drums
Rick Tivens – fiddle, mandolin
Tim Gray – hammer dulcimer
Paul Kleinwald – banjo
Zip Zantay – clarinet
Bob Bowes, Dick Delmolino, Mike Joyce, Jim Labbee – background vocals
Greg Steele – recording engineer and producer at Derek Studios

References

Arlo Guthrie albums
1992 albums
Rising Son Records albums